Thalapathi is a 1991 Indian Tamil-language gangster drama film written and directed by Mani Ratnam, and produced by G. Venkateswaran. The film stars Rajinikanth and Mammootty with Arvind Swamy in his feature-film debut, Jaishankar, Amrish Puri, Srividya, Bhanupriya, Shobana and Geetha in supporting roles. It is about a courageous slum dweller who befriends a powerful don and the attempts of a district collector to thwart them.

The plot of Thalapathi is based on the friendship between Karna and Duryodhana, characters from the Hindu epic, Mahabharata. Ilaiyaraaja, in his last collaboration with Mani Ratnam, composed the film's score and soundtrack, and the lyrics were written by poet Vaali. The cinematography was handled by Santosh Sivan and the editor was Suresh Urs. Most of the filming took place in Karnataka state.

Thalapathi was released on 5 November 1991, Diwali day; it became a critical and commercial success, and won many awards including two Filmfare Awards South: Best Director – Tamil (Ratnam) and Best Music Director – Tamil (Ilaiyaraaja), and two Cinema Express Awards: Best Actor – Tamil (Rajinikanth) and Best Character Actress (Srividya). It was remade in Kannada as Annavru (2003).

Plot 
On the day of the Bhogi festival, fourteen-year-old Kalyani gives birth to a boy alone and, fearing societal backlash and incapacity, abandons him inside a moving goods train. A slum dweller finds the baby, takes him home, names him Surya and raises him. The child  grows up to be intolerant of injustice, especially to the poor, and wonders why his biological mother abandoned him. The only item from his mother is the yellow shawl in which she had placed him. Devaraj, a powerful gangster, who is kind but feared by most, fights injustice with violence. Surya attacks and kills Ramana, an auxiliary of Devaraj. Surya is arrested for murder and faces brutal torture from police, but Devaraj bails him out after perceiving Ramana's felony and realises Surya's cause was genuine. Surya and Devaraj, who share an ideology, come to understand each other. Devaraj declares Surya as his Thalapathi (commander) and best friend.

Arjun, the city's new district collector, wants to lawfully end violence. He is the second son of Kalyani, who is now a doctor. After abandoning Surya, her firstborn, she married Krishnamoorthy. Kalyani never told Arjun of the ordeal she faced as a teenager but is constantly grieved by thoughts of her long-lost firstborn. Meanwhile, Surya is courted by a Brahmin girl Subbulaxmi, who is smitten with his transparent nature. Surya's appraisal to Devaraj leads local people in the locality to respect them both. They continue objecting to societal incongruities. While Devaraj leads Surya to help curb unlawful discrepancies, Subbulaxmi despises Surya's use of violence and tries to persuade him against it. Devaraj tries to form a relationship between Subbulaxmi and Surya but Subbulaxmi's orthodox father objects and arranges her marriage to Arjun.

In his fight against organised crime, Arjun unsuccessfully targets Devaraj and Surya. Meanwhile, Padma, Ramana's widow, makes Surya feel guilty for killing Ramana. Understanding Padma's pain, Devaraj shelters her and her child. However, Padma confesses she is constantly troubled by the dishonourable men surrounding her. Devaraj, considering Padma and her daughter's safety and Surya's future, asks them to marry each other. Guilt-ridden, Surya marries Padma and eventually wins her child's affection. Later, at a medical camp, Kalyani meets Padma and her daughter, along with the shawl in which she wrapped Surya. After asking about the day he was found, Kalyani and Krishnamoorthy discover Surya is Kalyani's long-lost son during a suspect identification.  Krishnamoorthy secretly meets Surya and reveals the truth of his origin to him. Surya asks  Krishnamoorthy to promise not to let his mother know of Surya's identity because it would hurt her to know her son has grown to be a vigilante.

Kalyani eventually finds Surya and meets him. Surya vows not to harm Arjun for her sake. The long-standing feud between Devaraj and his main rival Kalivardhan makes Surya tell Devaraj, who learns of his meeting with his stepfather and mother  the truth about his family. Devaraj is pleased to know that, despite Arjun being Surya's half-brother, Surya still sides with him, thus valuing their friendship over family. Because of this, Devaraj decides to surrender. Devaraj and Surya meet Arjun, who now knows Surya is his own half-brother. Suddenly, Kalivardhan's henchmen open fire and Devaraj is killed. Enraged, Surya storms into Kalivardhan's house, murders Kalivardhan and all of his henchmen, and surrenders to the police, but is exonerated due to lack of evidence. Arjun is later transferred to another state with Subbulaxmi while Kalyani stays with Surya.

Cast

Production

Development 
Rajinikanth was a friend of Mani Ratnam's brother G. Venkateswaran of GV Films, and they were talking about making a film together. Ratnam had met Rajinikanth twice because he had expressed interest in working with Ratnam, who had nothing for him then.  Ratnam needed a film with scope for Rajinikanth's stardom but would remain Ratnam's film. Ratnam wanted something Rajinikanth could not refuse and that Ratnam really wanted to do. Soon the concept of the story of Karna from the Indian epic Mahabharata, which became the basis for Thalapathi and was a contemporary version of the Mahabharata from Karna's perspective, came up. Ratnam wanted to present a realistic Rajinikanth, which he saw in Mullum Malarum (1978) without his style elements and larger-than-life image. Thalapathi was cinematographer Santosh Sivan's first film in Tamil and his first project with Ratnam. The film was edited by Suresh Urs, and art-directed by Thota Tharani. Thalapathi remains the only collaboration between Ratnam and Rajinikanth.

Casting 
Rajinikanth played Surya, who is a representation of Karna. Rajinikanth insisted Karna's friend Duryodhana, who is important to the story, was correctly cast; Mammootty was eventually cast as Devaraj, the equivalent of Duryodhana. He was then filming for Joshiy's Kuttettan (1990) and initially declined the role after listening to Ratnam's narration of the story, but after advice from Joshiy, accepted. For the role of Surya's brother Arjun, Ratnam wanted someone with a sophisticated look and fluency in English. Mammootty suggested Jayaram to Ratnam for the role, but Jayaram declined due to scheduling conflicts. Ratnam saw Arvind Swamy in a television commercial and approached him to play Arjun; after a few screen tests, Arvind – who was only credited with his first name – was cast in his feature-film debut. Mammootty was paid  and Amrish Puri, who portrayed the antagonist Kalivardhan, and shaved his head for the role, received  for only five days of filming.

Despite being almost three years younger than Rajinikanth, Srividya was cast as Surya's mother Kalyani. When Bhanupriya was cast as Padma, the widow of a man killed by Surya, whom she later marries, Ratnam told her there would be no songs for her because Surya "was the cause of her husband's death. So it can't be the start of a new romantic track". Ratnam said the casting of Bhanupriya showed "there was some weight to the character, and you don't have to invest in terms of songs and things like that. Her very presence makes the character strong". Shobana was cast as Subbulaxmi, her second film role opposite Rajinikanth after Siva (1989). Manoj K. Jayan was cast as Manoharan – his first role in Tamil cinema – after Ratnam was impressed with his performance in the Malayalam film Perumthachan (1990). Krishna was chosen to play the young version of Surya but the character was later scrapped because it affected the film's length.

Filming 

Principal photography began before the role of Arjun had been cast. Ratnam said he chose to film in Mysore, Karnataka, because it had everything the script required, including a waterfront and a river. According to Sivan, Ratnam chose Mysore because "there'd be less people, or at least less people" having extreme adulation for Rajinikanth. The slum scenes were filmed in Madras on a set that was erected by Thota Tharani.

The first scene to be filmed was Subbulaxmi teaching a group of students by a river. Because the rising sun was important to the scene, it was filmed earlier than 5:45 am. By the time Rajinikanth came to film his part in the scene, the sun had already risen. To avoid continuity errors, he filmed after 4:30 am the next day. When filming against the "early morning or the late evening sun" was not possible, the crew used tungsten lights and mirrors to create the intended effect.

Ratnam chose to film the prologue in which Kalyani gives birth to Surya in black and white because according to him, "Black and white gives the sense of this being a prologue without us having to define it as a prologue". Rajinikanth said he had a tough time while filming because Ratnam "was from a different school of film making and asked me to feel emotions even when taking part in a fight scene". Ratnam delayed filming the scene in which Surya meets his biological mother for the first time by a day at the request of Rajinikanth, who needed more time to prepare.

The songs "Rakkamma Kaiya Thattu" and "Sundari Kannal" were filmed at Rayagopura, Melukote and Chennakeshava Temple, Somanathapura – both in Karnataka – respectively. "Rakkamma Kaiya Thattu" was filmed over the course of several nights, and was choreographed by Prabhu Deva and his father Mugur Sundar. Rajinikanth wore Samurai apparel for "Sundari Kannal"; according to The Hindu S. Shiva Kumar, this was the closest Ratnam came to doing something like his idol Akira Kurosawa.

Themes 
Thalapathi is a contemporary adaptation of the Mahabharata but because the film's focus is Surya, it dispenses with the epic's ensemble nature. The character Subbulaxmi is based on Draupadi, Arjun on Arjuna and Kalyani on Kunti. The film was not originally publicised as an adaptation of the Mahabharata; Ratnam said this was because the "parallels are hidden sufficiently inside the story to make it work. That is the way I wanted it – at a layer below and not crying out loud". Venkateswaran said the film "questions people's normally held ideas of friendship". According to New Straits Times, the film does not extol crime or violence; rather it narrates the story of a tragic character who rises from slums to gain untold riches and unbridled power.

Ratnam refused to name Surya's father, saying the film "consciously avoids the who and the how of the underage girl's first love. It was the child, the son of Surya, who formed the story". The name Surya was chosen to emphasise the character's connection to the sun, similar to the way Karna is the son of the sun god Surya in the Mahabharata. Ratnam did not consider killing Surya, unlike the Mahabharata in which Karna dies, because he "always wished that he lived on. So much has gone wrong. There's so much stacked against him. Maybe there's a bit of hope, a bit of optimism in this, but I felt that his death would look too doomed, too tragic".

Soundtrack 

The soundtrack was composed by Ilaiyaraaja, with lyrics written by Vaali. Thalapathi marked the final collaboration between Ilaiyaraaja, Vaali and Ratnam, as the latter had associated with  A. R. Rahman and Vairamuthu for all of his projects, beginning with Roja (1992), which marked Rahman's debut. The original Tamil version of the soundtrack album includes seven songs with lyrics that were written by Vaali. The six songs of the Hindi-dubbed version Dalapathi were written by P. K. Mishra. Rajasri wrote the lyrics for the Telugu-dubbed version. Lahari Music released the Kannada-dubbed version of the film's soundtrack which was titled Nanna Dalapathi, and V. Nagendra Prasad penned its lyrics.

Marketing 
In a first-of-its-kind marketing strategy in India, GV Films launched "a whole range of consumer products" based on the lead character of Thalapathi. As part of the marketing strategy, all products would be "of the highest quality" and sport the film's name.

Release 
Thalapathi was released on 5 November 1991 during the Diwali festival. Thalapathi was a  major critical and commercial success.

Reception 
On 8 November 1991, The Hindu said; "Moving his pieces with the acumen of an international grandmaster, the director sets a hot pace". The same day, N. Krishnaswamy of The Indian Express said; "One reason why Thalapathi, despite its visual grandeur is not as riveting as it should have been is that it does not have a strong antagonist". On 1 December 1991, the review board of Ananda Vikatan praised Ilaiyaraaja's music, called the film a mountain of a masala entertainer, and said Rajinikanth had several scenes in which he could emote and that he looks a caged lion left in the open. The magazine Kalki wrote a review of the film as a discussion panel alongside directors S. P. Muthuraman and Mahendran reviewing the film. In that review, the film's cast performances, cinematography and music were praised but the violence was criticised.

Accolades

Legacy 
C. S. Amudhan said Thalapathi was "really ahead of its time" and called it "intellectual entertaining cinema". Karthik Subbaraj said he watched the film during his childhood. Subbaraj's 2014 film Jigarthanda includes several references to  Thalapathi. Rajinikanth's daughter, director Soundarya, said; "I remember Thalapathy most vividly as that was the first time I went for a first-day-first-show ever". Mammootty's performance in the scene in which Devaraj tells Arjun "mudiyathu" after being asked to surrender everything inspired director Mahi V Raghav to cast him in Yatra (2019).

Thamizh Padam (2010) parodied Thalapathi by featuring scenes with characters who are dimly lit and speak one-word dialogues. Atlee, who directed Raja Rani (2013), cites Thalapathi as the main inspiration that led him to consider a career in cinema. Soundarya has stated Rajinikanth's hairstyle in her directorial venture Kochadaiiyaan (2014) was inspired by his appearance in Thalapathi. Baradwaj Rangan compared Kadal (2013) to Thalapathi, both of which feature a character "who yearns for a lost mother and who is coerced into a life of crime".

Remakes
Thalapathi was remade in Kannada as Annavru (2003). In November 2011, Bollywood producer Bharat Shah acquired the Hindi remake rights, despite having a Hindi dubbed version for this film released in 1993.

Notes

References

Bibliography

External links 
 
 

1990s Tamil-language films
1991 films
Films about organised crime in India
Films based on the Mahabharata
Films directed by Mani Ratnam
Films scored by Ilaiyaraaja
Films shot in Karnataka
Films shot in Kollam
Films shot in Mysore
Films shot in Ooty
1990s buddy drama films
Indian buddy drama films
Indian gangster films
Tamil films remade in other languages
Teenage pregnancy in film